R. Stanley Howland was an American tennis player active in the late 19th century and early 20th century.

Tennis career
Howland reached the semifinals of the U.S. National Championships in 1895.

External links 

American male tennis players
Year of birth missing
Year of death missing